WNVR (1030 AM, "Polskie Radio Chicago") is a radio station licensed to serve Vernon Hills, Illinois, United States.  WNVR is one of eight stations owned by Polnet Communications.

It broadcasts Polish language programming 24 hours a day. WNVR's studios are located at 3656 W. Belmont Ave. in Chicago, Illinois. Its transmitter site is off Route 176 west of Crystal Lake, Illinois.

History
WNVR began broadcasting March 1, 1988, airing an all-news format. The station's call sign stood for "News Voice Radio", which was its slogan at the time. The station was originally owned by Midwest Radio Associates, and ran 500 watts during daytime hours only, with its transmitter located in Mundelein, Illinois.

By 1989, the station had adopted a business news format, with programming from the Business Radio Network.

In 1993, WNVR was sold to Polnet Communications for $495,000, and the station adopted a Polish language format.

In 2000, nighttime operations were added, running 5 watts. Daytime power was increased that year to 5,000 watts (3,200 watts critical hours), using a directional array, with the station's daytime transmitter moving to its present location, west of Crystal Lake. In 2003, the station's nighttime power was increased to 120 watts, using a directional array at its present location. In 2009, the station's daytime power was increased to 10,000 watts.

References

External links

Polish-American culture in Illinois
Polish-language radio stations in the United States
Lake County, Illinois
NVR
Radio stations established in 1988
1988 establishments in Illinois